Louis Goetz (March 3, 1946 – January 19, 2021) was the head men's basketball coach at the University of Richmond from 1978 through 1981. Prior to leading the Richmond Spiders basketball program, he was the assistant coach at Duke University and the University of Utah under Bill Foster. Goetz played for Rutgers University from 1966 through 1969. He led the Spiders to a 38–44 record over three seasons.

Goetz grew up in Passaic, New Jersey. Both his parents were Jewish and spoke Yiddish; his father was the son of Polish and Romanian immigrants.

Goetz was a land developer in Durham, North Carolina, after his coaching career ended. He died in Durham on January 19, 2021, of cancer.

Head coaching record

References

External links
Where are they now? Lou Goetz of Passaic

1946 births
2021 deaths
American men's basketball players
American people of Polish-Jewish descent
American people of Romanian-Jewish descent
Basketball coaches from New Jersey
Basketball players from New Jersey
Duke Blue Devils men's basketball coaches
Richmond Spiders men's basketball coaches
Rutgers Scarlet Knights men's basketball players
Sportspeople from Durham, North Carolina
Sportspeople from Passaic, New Jersey
Utah Utes men's basketball coaches
Deaths from cancer in North Carolina